Alfonso Ugarte District is one of ten districts of the Sihuas Province in the Ancash Region of northern Peru.

See also 
 Pilanku
 Qulluta

References

Districts of the Sihuas Province
Districts of the Ancash Region

no:Cashapampa (distrikt)